The Piscataqua River Bridge is a through arch bridge that crosses the Piscataqua River, connecting Portsmouth, New Hampshire with Kittery, Maine. Carrying six lanes of Interstate 95, the bridge is the third modern span and first fixed crossing of the Piscataqua between Portsmouth and Kittery.  The two other spans, the Memorial Bridge and the Sarah Mildred Long Bridge, are both lift bridges, built to accommodate ship traffic along the Piscataqua. The high arch design of the Piscataqua River Bridge eliminates the need for a movable roadway.

History 

The development of the Interstate Highway System required new roadbeds to be constructed and existing ones to be absorbed into the network. In New Hampshire, Interstate 95 was routed along the New Hampshire Turnpike, which had opened to traffic in 1950, and paralleled U.S. Route 1 through New Hampshire's Seacoast region from the Massachusetts border to the Turnpike's end at the Portsmouth Traffic Circle. A gap remained between the traffic circle and the beginning of the Maine Turnpike on the other side of the Piscataqua River, filled by the US-1 Bypass. It crossed the river using the two-lane Sarah Mildred Long lift bridge, which was far from meeting Interstate Highway standards for four-lane highways and fixed spans.

The decision was made to extend I-95 north from the New Hampshire Turnpike at Portsmouth and south from the Maine Turnpike in Kittery, and join the roads with a high-speed fixed span over the Piscataqua. Work on the bridge began in 1968 and was completed in 1971, with the I-95 extension to it in Maine completed the following year.

Tragedy struck the site about midway through construction. On June 24, 1970, two of the I-beams supporting the staging area on the Kittery side of the span gave way, plunging four workers  to their deaths and leaving another seven injured. A memorial plaque was placed beneath the bridge on the Maine side, visible from Maine Route 103.

The bridge was officially opened on November 1, 1972, in a ceremony attended by the Governor of New Hampshire, Walter R. Peterson Jr., and the Governor of Maine, Kenneth M. Curtis.

A major rehabilitation and repair project began in 2019 and is expected to last until 2022.

See also

References

Further reading
 

Through arch bridges in the United States
Bridges completed in 1972
Interstate 95
Buildings and structures in Portsmouth, New Hampshire
Bridges in Rockingham County, New Hampshire
Road bridges in Maine
Road bridges in New Hampshire
Bridges on the Interstate Highway System
Steel bridges in the United States
1972 establishments in Maine
1972 establishments in New Hampshire